Grabowce Dolne  is a village in the administrative district of Gmina Nowodwór, within Ryki County, Lublin Voivodeship, in eastern Poland.

The village has an approximate population of 150.

References

Grabowce Dolne